Buhera West is a constituency of the National Assembly of the Parliament of Zimbabwe located in Manicaland Province. Its current MP since the 2018 election is Soul Dzuma of ZANU–PF.

Electoral history 
In 2008, Eric Matinenga of the MDC-Tsvangirai faction was elected MP for the constituency, defeating Tapiwa Zengeya (ZANU-PF), and independent candidate Stanlake Muzhingi.

References 

Parliamentary constituencies in Zimbabwe